Christian Keglevits (born 29 January 1961 in Weiden bei Rechnitz) is a retired Austrian footballer.

Club career
He started his career at SC Eisenstadt and also played for SK Rapid Wien, Wiener Sportclub, LASK Linz and SV Austria Salzburg. With Rapid he won two league titles and two domestic cups.

International career
He earned 18 caps and scored 3 goals for the Austria national football team from 1980 to 1991, 3 games of those in World Cup qualification matches, and participated in the 1990 FIFA World Cup. His last international was a November 1991 European Championship qualification match against Yugoslavia.

Honours
Austrian Football Bundesliga (2):
 1982, 1983
Austrian Cup (2):
 1983, 1984

References

External links
Profile - Rapid Archive

Austrian footballers
Austria international footballers
1990 FIFA World Cup players
SK Rapid Wien players
FC Red Bull Salzburg players
LASK players
Austrian Football Bundesliga players
Austrian football managers
Floridsdorfer AC managers
Grazer AK managers
1961 births
Living people
People from Oberwart District
Association football forwards
Footballers from Burgenland
Wiener Sport-Club players
Burgenland Croats